The following lists the top 25 albums of 2010  in Australia from the Australian Recording Industry Association (ARIA) End of Year Albums Chart.

Peak chart positions from 2010 are from the ARIA Charts, overall position on the End of Year Chart is calculated by the ARIA, based on the number of weeks and position that the records reach within the Top 100 albums chart for each week during 2010.

Notes

References 

Australian record charts
2010 in Australian music
Australia Top 25 Albums